Thabiso Maile (born 27 January 1987) is a Mosotho footballer who currently plays as a defender for Lerotholi Polytechnic. He has won seven caps and scored two goals for the Lesotho national football team since 2006.

External links

Association football defenders
Lesotho footballers
Lesotho international footballers
1987 births
Living people